The solo technical routine competition at 2013 World Aquatics Championships was held on July 20 with the preliminary round in the morning and the final in the evening session.

Results
The preliminary round was held at 09:00 and the final at 19:00.

Green denotes finalists

References

Solo technical routine